was a Japanese Samurai and Daimyo of the Edo period, who served Tokugawa Shogunate. He was a son of Torii Mototada, a retainer of Tokugawa Ieyasu. 

In 1603, following the Battle of Sekigahara, he become the first lord (daimyō) of Iwakitaira Domain in Japan's Mutsu Province, worth 100,000 koku.

In 1622, he was moved to the larger fief of Yamagata in Dewa Province, worth 260,000 koku.

|-

|-

1567 births
1628 deaths
Daimyo
Torii clan